Jason Drandon Botterill (born May 19, 1976) is a Canadian former professional ice hockey left winger and executive who is currently serving as an assistant general manager of the Seattle Kraken of the National Hockey League (NHL). Botterill was the former associate GM of the Pittsburgh Penguins before serving as general manager of the Buffalo Sabres from May 11, 2017 to June 16, 2020.

Playing career
Botterill was drafted by the Dallas Stars in the first round with the 20th overall selection of the 1994 NHL Entry Draft. Before turning pro, he played four seasons (1993–97) at the University of Michigan, where he helped lead the Wolverines to an NCAA national championship in 1996. He is the only Canadian to ever win a gold medal in three straight World Junior Hockey Championships. In eight seasons as a pro, Botterill played in 481 professional games, including 88 in the National Hockey League with the Dallas Stars, Atlanta Thrashers, Calgary Flames, and Buffalo Sabres. Other stops in his career included the Michigan K-Wings and Orlando Solar Bears of the International Hockey League and the Saint John Flames of the American Hockey League, where he was a member of the 2001 Calder Cup championship team. After serving as the Flames captain in 2001–02, Botterill signed with Buffalo as a free agent.

Botterill's career was abruptly halted when, as a member of the Rochester Americans, he suffered a concussion during a game against the Syracuse Crunch on October 31, 2004. After missing the next 49 games, Botterill announced his retirement from hockey.

Management career
Botterill received his MBA from The Stephen M. Ross School of Business at the University of Michigan in 2007. Following his playing career, he worked with the NHL Offices and the NHL Central Registry and spent the 2006–2007 season as a scout for the Dallas Stars.

On July 17, 2007, the Pittsburgh Penguins announced Botterill's hiring as director of hockey administration. His main responsibilities included monitoring the salary cap and contract research and negotiations, but also worked with salary arbitration and preparation as well as scouting.  Botterill was promoted by the Penguins to assistant general manager on May 22, 2009. He replaced Chuck Fletcher, who was named general manager of the Minnesota Wild on the same day. In The Hockey News 2011 edition of the 100 Most Powerful People in ice hockey, Botterill was considered one of the Top 40 under the age of 40. On May 16, 2014 Botterill was named as interim general manager of the Pittsburgh Penguins and as a candidate for the full position. On June 6, 2014, Jim Rutherford was named general manager of the Penguins. In his press conference, Rutherford announced that Botterill would be named associate general manager of the Penguins. 

On May 11, 2017, the Buffalo Sabres announced that Botterill had been hired as the team's general manager. He was fired by the Sabres on June 16, 2020.

On January 5, 2021, the Seattle Kraken announced that Botterill had been hired as the team's assistant general manager.

Personal life
Botterill was born in Edmonton, Alberta, but grew up in Winnipeg, Manitoba. Jason's sister, Jennifer Botterill, enjoyed numerous hockey successes with the Canadian women's team, before retiring in 2011. His mother, Doreen McCannell, participated in speed skating at the 1964 and 1968 Winter Olympics. His father, Cal Botterill, is a professor at the University of Winnipeg.

Career statistics

Regular season and playoffs

International

Awards and honours

References

External links

1976 births
Living people
Atlanta Thrashers players
Buffalo Sabres players
Buffalo Sabres executives
Calgary Flames players
Canadian ice hockey left wingers
Dallas Stars draft picks
Dallas Stars players
Dallas Stars scouts
Ice hockey people from Edmonton
Ice hockey people from Winnipeg
Kalamazoo Wings (1974–2000) players
Michigan Wolverines men's ice hockey players
National Hockey League executives
National Hockey League first-round draft picks
Orlando Solar Bears (IHL) players
Pittsburgh Penguins executives
Rochester Americans players
Ross School of Business alumni
Saint John Flames players
NCAA men's ice hockey national champions
AHCA Division I men's ice hockey All-Americans